The 1963 Southwestern Louisiana Bulldogs football team was an American football team that represented the University of Southwestern Louisiana (now known as the University of Louisiana at Lafayette) in the Gulf States Conference during the 1963 NCAA College Division football season. In their third year under head coach Russ Faulkinberry, the team compiled a 4–5 record.

The Bulldogs season finale at McNeese State was originally scheduled for November 23 but postponed to November 26 in deference to the assassination of John F. Kennedy which occurred on November 22.

Schedule

References

Southwestern Louisiana
Louisiana Ragin' Cajuns football seasons
Southwestern Louisiana Bulldogs football